In elementary arithmetic, a standard algorithm or method is a specific method of computation which is conventionally taught for solving particular mathematical problems. These methods vary somewhat by nation and time, but generally include exchanging, regrouping, long division, and long multiplication using a standard notation, and standard formulas for average, area, and volume. Similar methods also exist for procedures such as square root and even more sophisticated functions, but have fallen out of the general mathematics curriculum in favor of calculators (or tables and slide rules before them).

The concepts of reform mathematics which the NCTM introduced in 1989 favors an alternative approach. It proposes a deeper understanding of the underlying theory instead of memorization of specific methods will allow students to develop individual methods which solve the same problems. Students' alternative algorithms are often just as correct, efficient, and generalizable as the standard algorithms, and maintain emphasis on the meaning of the quantities involved, especially as relates to place values (something that is usually lost in the memorization of standard algorithms). The development of sophisticated calculators has made manual calculation less important (see the note on square roots, above) and cursory teaching of traditional methods has created failure among many students. Greater achievement among all types of students is among the primary goals of mathematics education put forth by NCTM. Some researchers such as Constance Kamii have suggested that elementary arithmetic, as traditionally taught, is not appropriate in elementary school.  Many first editions of textbooks written to the original 1989 standard such as TERC deliberately discouraged teaching of any particular method, instead devoting class and homework time to the solving of nontrivial problems, which stimulate students to develop their own methods of calculation, rooted in number sense and place value. This emphasis by no means excludes the learning of number facts; indeed, a major goal of early mathematical education is procedural fluency.

The NCTM in recent revisions has made more explicit this need for learning of basic math facts and correct, efficient methods. Many new editions of standards-based texts do present standard methods and basic skills. However, the original guidelines continue to draw fire from well-meaning parents and community members, some of whom advocate a return to traditional mathematics. Success of a particular text depends not only upon its content, but also on the willingness of a school community to allow new pedagogy and content and to commit to the recommended implementation of the materials.

Mathematics education